Achlya is a genus of oomycete (water mold), in the family Saprolegniaceae. The genus includes several plant pathogens including Achlya conspicua and Achlya klebsiana. Unlike many other microorganisms, cell expansion is governed by changes in cell wall strength rather than changes in osmotic pressure. The genome of Achlya hypogyna has been sequenced and can be accessed on public online databases, for example on the NCBI website (National Center for Biotechnology Information). 

The genus was first circumscribed in Nova Acta Phys.-Med. Acad. Caes. Leop.-Carol. Nat. Cur. vol.11 on page 514 in 1823 by Christian Gottfried Daniel Nees von Esenbeck. 

The type species is Achlya prolifera.

The genus name of Achlya is named after Achlys, who in the Hesiodic Shield of Heracles, is one of the figures depicted on Heracles' shield, perhaps representing the personification of sorrow. 

Several Achyla spp. are pathogens of rice seedlings.

Species
As accepted by Species Fungorum;

Achlya abortispora 
Achlya abortiva 
Achlya achlyoides 
Achlya ambisexualis Raper (1939)
Achlya ambispora Steciow (2001)
Achlya americana 
Achlya androcomposita 
Achlya anomala 
Achlya aquatica Dayal & J. Thakur (1969)
Achlya bisexualis Coker & Couch (1927)
Achlya bispora 
Achlya bonariensis 
Achlya caroliniana 
Achlya colorata Pringsh. (1882)
Achlya conspicua Coker (1923)
Achlya crenulata 
Achlya debaryana 
Achlya diffusa 
Achlya dubia 
Achlya echinulata 
Achlya flagellata 
Achlya flexuosa 
Achlya formosana 
Achlya fuegiana 
Achlya glomerata 
Achlya haehneliana 
Achlya heterosexualis 
Achlya imperfecta Coker (1923)
Achlya inflata 
Achlya intricata 
Achlya kamatii 
Achlya kashyapia 
Achlya klebsiana Pieters (1915)
Achlya lobata 
Achlya michiganensis 
Achlya orion Coker & Couch (1920)
Achlya oryzae 
Achlya oviparvula 
Achlya pacifica 
Achlya papillosa 
Achlya primoachlya 
Achlya prolifera 
Achlya proliferoides 
Achlya pseudoachlyoides 
Achlya pseudoradiosa 
Achlya racemosa Hildebr. (1867)
Achlya radiosa 
Achlya regularis 
Achlya robusta 
Achlya rodrigueziana 
Achlya sparrowii 
Achlya spiracaulis 
Achlya spiralis 
Achlya subterranea 
Achlya truncatiformis M.W. Dick & Mark A. Spencer (2002)
Achlya tuberculata 
Achlya turfosa 

Former species; (all are Saprolegniaceae family)

 A. abortiva f. normalis  = Achlya abortiva
 A. acadiensis  = Newbya androgyna, 
 A. ambisexualis var. abjointa  = Achlya ambisexualis
 A. ambisexualis var. gracilis  = Achlya ambisexualis
 A. americana var. cambrica  = Achlya americana
 A. americana var. megasperma  = Achlya americana
 A. americana var. megasperma  = Achlya americana
 A. androgyna  = Newbya androgyna
 A. apiculata  = Newbya apiculata
 A. apiculata var. forbesiana  = Newbya apiculata
 A. apiculata var. prolifica  = Newbya apiculata
 A. benekei  = Protoachlya benekei
 A. bisexualis var. ambisexualis  = Achlya ambisexualis
 A. brasiliensis  = Newbya brasiliensis
 A. braunii  = Newbya androgyna
 A. cambrica  = Achlya americana
 A. curvicollis  = Newbya curvicollis
 A. debaryana var. americana  = Achlya americana,
 A. debaryana var. intermedia  = Achlya debaryana
 A. dioica  = Saprolegnia dioica, Saprolegniaceae
 A. dubia var. pigmenta  = Achlya dubia
 A. flagellata var. yezoensis  = Achlya flagellata
 A. klebsiana var. indica  = Achlya klebsiana
 A. lignicola  = Achlya racemosa
 A. megasperma  = Newbya megasperma
 A. mucronata  = Protoachlya mucronata
 A. oblongata  = Newbya oblongata
 A. oblongata var. gigantica  = Newbya oblongata
 A. oblongata var. globosa  = Newbya oblongata
 A. oligocantha  = Newbya oligocantha
 A. oligocantha var. brevispina  = Newbya oligocantha
 A. ornata  = Newbya pascuicola
 A. paradoxa  = Isoachlya paradoxa
 A. polyandra sensu  = Achlya debaryana
 A. polyandra  = Newbya polyandra
 A. racemosa f. maxima  = Achlya racemosa
 A. racemosa f. polyspora  = Achlya racemosa
 A. racemosa var. lignicola  = Achlya racemosa
 A. racemosa var. maxima  = Achlya racemosa
 A. racemosa var. spinosa  = Newbya spinosa
 A. racemosa var. stelligera  = Achlya racemosa
 A. recurva  = Newbya recurva
 A. spinosa  = Newbya spinosa
 A. stellata  = Newbya stellata
 A. stellata var. multispora  = Protoachlya mucronata
 A. treleaseana  = Newbya androgyna

References

Further reading

Water mould genera
Saprolegniales